Raúl Ibarra (6 April 1908 – 18 July 2002) was a Mexican sports shooter. He competed at the 1952, 1956, 1960 and 1964 Summer Olympics.

References

1908 births
2002 deaths
Mexican male sport shooters
Olympic shooters of Mexico
Shooters at the 1952 Summer Olympics
Shooters at the 1956 Summer Olympics
Shooters at the 1960 Summer Olympics
Shooters at the 1964 Summer Olympics
Sportspeople from Campeche
Pan American Games medalists in shooting
Pan American Games gold medalists for Mexico
Pan American Games bronze medalists for Mexico
Shooters at the 1951 Pan American Games
Shooters at the 1955 Pan American Games
Medalists at the 1951 Pan American Games
20th-century Mexican people